Koh-Lanta: Palau was the ninth season of the French version of Survivor. This season took place on the island of Palau within Micronesia, and was broadcast on TF1 from August 28, 2009, to October 30, 2009, airing on Fridays at 6:55 p.m. The two original tribes this season were Koror and Mawaï.

The winner of this season of Koh-lanta was Christina who won the prize of €100,000.

Contestants

Future appearances
Freddy Boucher and Christina Chevry returned for Koh-Lanta: Le Choc des Héros. Boucher later returned for a third time, alongside Fabienne Lefebvre-Trehoux, Isabelle Da Silva and Patrick Merle for Koh-Lanta: La Revanche des Héros. Da Silva, Boucher and Chevry returned again for Koh-Lanta: La Nouvelle Édition. Raphaële Navarro returned for Koh-Lanta: Le Combat des Héros. Freddy Boucher, Christina Chevry and Patrick Merle returned again for Koh-Lanta: La Légende.

Voting History

Notes

09
2009 French television seasons
Television shows filmed in Palau